Jagiellonia Białystok II is a Polish football team, which serves as the reserve side of Jagiellonia Białystok. They compete in the III liga, the fourth division of Polish football, after having won promotion in 2020.

Jagiellonia II was the winner of the Białystok's Polish Cup in 1980–81, 1983–84, 1987–88, 1989–90 and 1990–91. This gave them the right to participate in the cup at the central level next season. Additionally, Jagiellonia's reserves played in the Polish Cup in seasons 2004–05 and 2005–06.

Polish Cup records

References

External links
 Jagiellonia Białystok II at the Jagiellonia's official website 
 Jagiellonia Białystok II at 90minut.pl 

 
Football clubs in Białystok
Reserve team football in Poland